

Ghulam Mohammed Sadiq (1912 – 1971) was an Indian politician, who served as the Prime Minister of Jammu and Kashmir from 1964 to 1965, when the position was renamed to Chief Minister. He continued as the Chief Minister till his death in 1971.

Education and career
He was a graduate of Islamia College in Lahore and Aligarh Muslim University. He served in Sheikh Abdullah’s first cabinet from 1947 to 1953.  and was the leader of the National Conference party from 1957 to 1961 after which he joined the Indian National Congress. He was elected the Prime Minister of Jammu and Kashmir in 1964. He became the first chief minister of the state in 1965, when the J&K Constitution was amended (Sixth Constitution of J&K Amendment Act, 1965) by the then Congress government, and the position of Prime Minister was replaced with Chief Minister.

He died in office following a heart attack on December 12, 1971.

References

Bibliography
 
 

1912 births
1971 deaths
Kashmiri people
Jammu & Kashmir National Conference politicians
Recipients of the Padma Vibhushan in public affairs
Chief Ministers of Jammu and Kashmir
Chief ministers from Indian National Congress
Indian National Congress politicians
Jammu and Kashmir MLAs 1962–1967
Jammu and Kashmir MLAs 1967–1972